The  New York Giants season was the franchise's 43rd season in the National Football League. The Giants improved from 1–12–1 the previous season to 7–7, and finished in second place in the NFL Eastern Conference/Century Division.

Offseason
On August 5, Emlen Tunnell, formerly of the Giants, became the first African-American to be inducted into the Pro Football Hall of Fame.

NFL draft

Notable transactions
 March 7, 1967 – The Minnesota Vikings traded quarterback Fran Tarkenton to the New York Giants in exchange for the Giants' first and second round picks in the 1967 NFL draft, first round pick in 1968, and third round pick in 1969.

Regular season

Schedule

Game summaries

Week 11 vs Eagles

Week 14

Standings

Roster

Awards and honors
Homer Jones, Franchise Record, Most Receiving Yards in One Season, 1,209 Yards

See also
List of New York Giants seasons

References

 New York Giants on Pro Football Reference
 Giants on jt-sw.com

New York Giants seasons
New York Giants
New York Giants
1960s in the Bronx